The Fort São José do Encoje, (Fortaleza de São José do Encoje in Portuguese) is located in São José do Encoje, province of Uíge, Angola.

It was established in 1759 to ensure trade with the interior. Built out of stone and lime, it had a square shape with a bastion on each edge, nine artillery pieces and a garrison of 100 to 150 militia. It contained a barracks, a dungeon, guardshouse and the gunpowder magazine. It was ruined by 1906. In 1956 some pieces were relocated to the Museu do Congo in Uíge. It was classified as a national monument on May 30, 1925.

See also
Portuguese Angola

References

1759 establishments in the Portuguese Empire
Portuguese forts
Portuguese Angola
Forts in Angola